Edwin Milton Sabol (September 11, 1916 – February 9, 2015) was an American filmmaker and the founder (with his son Steve Sabol, among others) of NFL Films. He was elected to the Pro Football Hall of Fame in 2011 as a contributor due to his works with NFL Films.

Early life, education, and career
Sabol was born to a Jewish mother and Romanian father in Atlantic City, New Jersey in 1916 and raised in Blairstown, New Jersey. While attending Blair Academy, he excelled in several sports, and set a World Interscholastic Swimming record in the 100-yard freestyle race. He continued his noted swimming career at Ohio State University. He was selected for the 1936 Olympic team but refused to participate because of the games' connections to Nazi Germany. He had some success in the theater as an actor, appearing on Broadway for the production of Where Do We Go from Here. He served in World War II, and upon returning to civilian life, worked as a clothing salesman out of his father-in-law's factory.

NFL Films
Sabol founded Blair Motion Pictures in 1962. Its first major contract was to film the 1962 NFL Championship Game between the New York Giants and the Green Bay Packers at Yankee Stadium in New York. In 1964, Blair Motion Pictures became NFL Films, with an exclusive deal to preserve NFL games on film.  It has been said by his son Steve Sabol, of NFL Films, "The only other human endeavor more thoroughly captured on 16-mm film than the National Football League is World War II." In 1995, he officially retired from NFL Films in his role as President and chairman. In 1996, he was elected to the International Jewish Sports Hall of Fame.

On February 5, 2011, Sabol was elected to the Pro Football Hall of Fame in Canton, Ohio.

Death
Sabol died on February 9, 2015, at his home in Arizona.

Awards and honors
 1935: World Interscholastic Record holder, 100-yard freestyle swimming
 1937: Big Ten championship, 400-yard freestyle relay swimming
 1937: National AAU championship, 400-yard freestyle relay swimming
 91 Emmy Awards (to NFL Films)
 1987: Order of the Leather Helmet (presented by the NFL Alumni Association)
 1987: Bert Bell Memorial Award (presented by the NFL)
 1991: Pete Rozelle Award (presented by the NFL)
 1996: International Jewish Sports Hall of Fame
 2003: Lifetime Achievement Emmy
 2004: John Grierson International Gold Medal
 2011: Pro Football Hall of Fame

References

External links
 
 
 International Jewish Sports Hall of Fame profile

1916 births
2015 deaths
American cinematographers
Film producers from New Jersey
American male actors
American male swimmers
American military personnel of World War II
Blair Academy alumni
Jewish American sportspeople
NFL Films people
Ohio State Buckeyes men's swimmers
People from Warren County, New Jersey
Pete Rozelle Radio-Television Award recipients
Pro Football Hall of Fame inductees
Sports Emmy Award winners
Sportspeople from Atlantic City, New Jersey
Sportspeople from Warren County, New Jersey
Jewish American military personnel
American people of Romanian descent
21st-century American Jews